Canipsa suspensalis is a species of snout moth. It was described by Francis Walker in 1866 and is found in Indonesia (including Borneo and Java).

References

Epipaschiinae
Moths described in 1866